Olav Kooij (born 17 October 2001) is a Dutch professional racing cyclist, who currently rides for UCI WorldTeam .

Career
He finished second to David Dekker, in his first UCI race with the team at the Ster van Zwolle, before he took three successive victories – either side of the enforced break from racing due to the COVID-19 pandemic – at the Trofej Umag, the Poreč Trophy and the GP Kranj.

The following month, he won the opening stage of the Settimana Internazionale di Coppi e Bartali in a sprint finish, ahead of Ethan Hayter and Phil Bauhaus.

In February 2021, Team Jumbo–Visma announced that Kooij would make an immediate move to the World Tour Team, thus becoming the first teenager cyclist to have a full season contract with the team since its creation.

Major results

2018
 1st  Overall La Coupe du Président de la Ville de Grudziądz
1st  Points classification
1st  Young rider classification
1st Stages 1b & 4
2019
 Tour de DMZ
1st Stages 1, 3 & 5
 1st Stage 3 Driedaagse van Axel
 4th Road race, National Junior Road Championships
 4th Johan Museeuw Classic
 5th La Route des Géants Saint-Omer–Ypres
 6th Omloop der Vlaamse Gewesten
 7th Road race, UEC European Junior Road Championships
 8th EPZ Omloop van Borsele
2020
 1st  Overall Orlen Nations Grand Prix
1st Stages 1 (TTT) & 2
 1st Trofej Umag
 1st Poreč Trophy
 1st GP Kranj
 1st Stage 1a Settimana Internazionale di Coppi e Bartali
 2nd Ster van Zwolle
 5th Road race, UEC European Under-23 Road Championships
2021
 CRO Race
1st  Points classification
1st Stages 2 & 4
 3rd  Road race, UCI Road World Under-23 Championships
 3rd Gran Piemonte
2022
 1st  Overall ZLM Toer
1st  Points classification
1st  Young rider classification
1st Stages 1, 2 & 5
 1st  Overall Circuit de la Sarthe
1st  Young rider classification
1st Stages 2 & 4
 1st Münsterland Giro
 Danmark Rundt
1st Stages 1 & 3
 1st Stage 1 Tour de Pologne
 1st Stage 1 Tour de Hongrie
 5th Road race, UCI Road World Under-23 Championships
 5th Classic Brugge–De Panne
2023
 Paris–Nice
1st Stages 3 (TTT) & 5

Notes

References

External links

2001 births
Living people
Dutch male cyclists
People from Hoeksche Waard
Sportspeople from South Holland